
Gmina Milanów is a rural gmina (administrative district) in Parczew County, Lublin Voivodeship, in eastern Poland.

Neighbouring gminas
Gmina Milanów is bordered by the gminas of Jabłoń, Komarówka Podlaska, Parczew, Siemień, Wisznice and Wohyń.

Villages
The gmina contains the following villages having the status of sołectwo: Cichostów, Czeberaki, Kopina, Kostry, Milanów, Okalew, Radcze, Rudno (solectwos: Rudno I, Rudno II and Rudno III), Rudzieniec and Zieleniec.

References

Polish official population figures 2006

Milanow
Parczew County